Chittor Vijay is a 1947 Hindi language film directed by Mohan Sinha, featuring Raj Kapoor and Madhubala in the lead roles.

Cast 

 Raj Kapoor
 Madhubala as Sobhagya Devi
 Monica Desai
 Madan Puri

Music
"Aaye Re Aaye Badal Jaise Chori"
"Ber Le Lo Ber"
"Har Zaban Par Ek Nara"
"Ho Rangoli Ho Rasila Rakhi Ka Din Aaya Re"
"Kahe More Mohan Ne Mujhko Bulaya"
"Mai Chumchum Karthi Bijli Hu"
"Naino Se Naino Ki Pyas Bujhao"
"Pi Lo Maharaja"

References

External links 

 

1947 films
1940s Hindi-language films
Films scored by S. D. Burman
Indian black-and-white films